Total Baseball (latest edition , first published 1989) is a baseball encyclopedia first compiled by John Thorn and Pete Palmer in 1989.  The latest edition, published in 2004, is its eighth. The encyclopedia contains seasonal and career statistics in numerous categories for every Major League player, as well as historical, opinion, and year-by-year essays.

History 
The idea for Total Baseball originated when two baseball statisticians and historians, Palmer and Thorn, realized that the current Baseball Encyclopedia endorsed by Major League Baseball contained numerous significant mistakes. These included miscalculations by earlier statisticians, typographic mistakes made by the original score keeper, and even "phantom" players who did not actually exist and were added to a box score incorrectly, Lou Proctor being a notable example. In addition, Thorn and Palmer took the liberty of correcting mistakes not commonly accepted by the baseball community, such as the apparent discovery that Ty Cobb actually garnered 4,189 hits, not 4,191, or that Walter Johnson in fact had 417 career wins, not 416. Thorn and Palmer also included new, sabermetric statistics developed by statisticians like Bill James, such as runs created or total average. The first edition of Total Baseball sold 75,000 copies, and by its fourth edition, Major League Baseball endorsed it as its official encyclopedia.

See also 
 Total Sports Publishing
 Baseball statistics

References 

Baseball books
Baseball statistics